Colatina Sociedade Esportiva, commonly known as Colatina, is a Brazilian football club based in Colatina, Espírito Santo state.

History
The club was founded on December 18, 2009. They finished in the third position in the Campeonato Capixaba Second Level in 2010, being promoted to the 2011 Campeonato Capixaba after the runners-up Estrela do Norte was punished.

Stadium
Colatina Sociedade Esportiva play their home games at Estádio Municipal Justiniano de Melo e Silva. The stadium has a maximum capacity of 12,000 people.

References

Association football clubs established in 2009
Football clubs in Espírito Santo
2009 establishments in Brazil